SANA, (born 16 June 1979), often credited on the film screen as Sana Nawaz, is a Pakistani film actress and model.

Sana was introduced to the Lollywood film industry by director Syed Noor in his film Sangam in 1997.

Sana won 'Best Actress' award at Nigar Awards in 2002 for her role Sitara in Yeh Dil Aap Ka Huwa (2002 film).

Filmography

Television 
{| class="wikitable"
|-
! Year!!Title!!Role!!Channel !! Notes !! Ref
|-
|2008|| Yeh Zindagi Hai || Sana ||Geo Entertainment|| ||
|-
|2012|| Jeena Sikha Do Hamein || ||Geo Entertainment|| ||
|-
|2012|| Zindagi Hath Barha || ||PTV Home|| ||
|-
|2013|| Noor-e-Nazar || || PTV Home|| ||
|-
|2013|| Shaggo || || TV One|| ||
|-
|2014||Dil Awaiz || ||  PTV Home|| ||
|-
|2015||Sawaab ||Nimra || Hum Sitaray|| ||
|-
|2016||Nautanki family || ||PTV Home|| ||
|-
|2016||Mujhe Bhi Khuda Ne Banaya Hai || || A-Plus Entertainment|| ||
|-
|2017||Alif Allah Aur Insaan ||Nigar Begum||Hum TV|| ||
|-
|2017||O Rangreza ||Sonia Jahan || Hum TV|| ||
|-
|2018||Seep ||Zebunnisa || TVOne Pakistan|| ||
|-
|2018||Bay Dardi ||Tabinda || ARY Digital|| ||
|-
|2018||Babban Khala Ki Betiyann || Durdana || ARY Digital|| ||
|-
|2018||Aapko Kya Takleef Hai ||Sana|| BOL Entertainment|| ||
|-
|2019||Saibaan ||Nargis|| Geo Entertainment|| ||
|-
|2019||Yateem || || A-Plus Entertainment|| ||
|-
|2019||Tu Mera Junoon ||Roshan|| Geo Entertainment|| ||
|-
|2021
|Qayamat||Pari||Geo Entertainment
|
|
|-
|2021
|Tehra Aangan
|
|Express Entertainment
|
|
|-
|2021
|Teri Behisi 
|Nighat
|Geo Entertainment
|
|
|-
|2022
|Teri Rah Mein
|Samiya
|ARY Digital
|
|
|-
|2022
|Tum Kahan Jaoge?
|
|Express Entertainment
|
|
|-
|2022
|Zakham|Seema
|Geo Entertainment
|
|
|}

Accolades

 Reality show 

 Madventures - Ary Digital – Winner
 Mazaaq Raat as Guest
 Jago Pakistan Jago as Guest
 Iftar Mulaqat''

See also 
 List of Lollywood actors

References

External links
 

Living people
20th-century Pakistani actresses
21st-century Pakistani actresses
Actresses from Lahore
Nigar Award winners
Pakistani film actresses
People from Multan
Punjabi people
1979 births